Memphis Belle is a 1990 British-American war drama film directed by Michael Caton-Jones and written by Monte Merrick. The film stars Matthew Modine, Eric Stoltz, and Harry Connick Jr. (in his film debut). Memphis Belle is a fictional version of the 1944 documentary Memphis Belle: A Story of a Flying Fortress by director William Wyler, about the 25th and last mission of an American Boeing B-17 Flying Fortress bomber, the Memphis Belle, based in England during World War II. The 1990 version was co-produced by David Puttnam and Wyler's daughter Catherine and dedicated to her father. The film closes with a dedication to all airmen, friend or foe, who fought in the skies above Europe during World War II.

Plot
The Memphis Belle, a B-17 Flying Fortress, and her crew are set to complete 25 missions, a prerequisite for the crew to complete their tour of duty. Along with the rest of the squadron, Belle is given the task of attacking a Focke Wulf 190 aircraft manufacturing plant in Bremen, Germany. Though initially escorted by P-51 Mustangs, the short-range fighters have to eventually withdraw, leaving the vulnerable bombers to fend for themselves to the target and back. The success of Belle carries a lot of significance in that she would be the first in the Eighth Air Force to complete her tour. Army publicist Lieutenant Colonel Bruce Derringer intends on using Belle's fame accrued from her record to sell vital war bonds.

Over Germany, Belle takes over as lead ship when the formation begins to take losses from flak and enemy planes. A smoke screen initially obscures the target, though on the second pass the formation successfully drops their payload on the now visible area. Returning home, the formation is continuously harassed by German planes. Radioman SSgt. Danny Daly is severely wounded, and damage causes a fire in one of the engines which Captain Dearborn is forced to extinguish by diving the plane, risking the aircraft in the process.

Further battle damage destroys the plane's electric systems that power the landing gear, though the crew successfully deploy the gear manually just prior to landing. Back on friendly soil, Lt. Colonel Derringer and the ground crew run to the plane to celebrate its victory, with Captain Dearborn opening a stowed bottle of Champagne aboard the aircraft with his crew. The closing credits state that the Memphis Belle flew her 25th and final mission on May 17, 1943, and that over a quarter of a million aircraft saw action over Western Europe during World War Two, with 200,000 airmen losing their lives and the film being dedicated in theirs and every serviceman's honour.

Cast
 Matthew Modine as Captain Dennis Dearborn, pilot: A humourless and socially inept perfectionist.
 Tate Donovan as 1st Lt. Luke Sinclair, co-pilot: The carefree former lifeguard believes himself to be undervalued by Dearborn.
 D.B. Sweeney as 1st Lt. Phil Lowenthal, navigator: Lowenthal is nervous before their final mission and convinced that he is doomed to die.
 Billy Zane as 1st Lt. Val Kozlowski, bombardier: While everyone believes the confident, self-assured Kozlowski to be a doctor, it is later revealed he attended only two weeks of medical school before enlisting.
 Eric Stoltz as Staff Sgt. (T/3) Danny "Danny Boy" Daly, radio operator: An earnest Irish-American, Daly was editor of the school paper, a valedictorian, and joined up right after graduating college.
 Reed Diamond as Staff Sgt. (T/3) Virgil "Virge" or "Virgin" Hoogesteger, top turret gunner and flight engineer: Hoogesteger worked for his family's restaurant and plans to open a chain of identical restaurants after the war despite his crew-mate's warnings that such an unheard of enterprise could never succeed.
 Sean Astin as Staff Sgt. Richard "Rascal" Moore, ball turret gunner: The diminutive, often crude gunner considers himself a ladies' man and delights in teasing his crewmates.
 Courtney Gains as Staff Sgt. Eugene "Genie" McVey, right waist gunner. A Catholic Irish-American from Cleveland.
 Neil Giuntoli as Sgt. Jack Bocci, left waist gunner: A hot-tempered Chicago hoodlum, Bocci appears to look out only for himself but proves surprisingly kind to his fellow waist gunner McVey. 
 Harry Connick Jr. as Staff Sgt. Clay Busby, tail gunner: After his father lost the family farm in a poker game, the laconic Busby earned money playing the piano in a New Orleans cathouse.
 David Strathairn as Col. Craig Harriman
 John Lithgow as Lt. Col. Bruce Derringer
 Jane Horrocks as Faith
 Mac McDonald as Les

Production

Five real B-17 warbirds were used in the filming of Memphis Belle, out of eight B-17s that were airworthy during the late 1980s. Two were located in the United States ( and ), two were in France (which was destroyed in a takeoff accident and  The Pink Lady), and one was in England ( Sally B). The original Memphis Belle was a B-17F model, so any B-17Gs used in the film were heavily modified to look like an earlier F model, having chin turrets removed, tail gun positions retrofitted with older designs and being painted olive drab green. During filming, two B-17s portrayed the Belle (one was the movie version of the Memphis Belle (N3703G) and the other was Sally B for scenes requiring pyrotechnics such as smoke and sparks indicating machine gun "hits") while the rest had nose art and squadron markings changed numerous times to make it appear there were more aircraft.

Ground sequences for the movie (including takeoff and landing scenes) were filmed at the non-operational RAF Binbrook in Lincolnshire, England with a period control tower and vehicles being placed on site. Flying sequences were flown from the airfield site of the Imperial War Museum Duxford. All the extras for the film were obtained from auditions held in the area and included current and former members of the Royal Air Force. The filmmakers also used Pinewood Studios to shoot interior scenes and to shoot various models of B-17s.

A North American B-25 Mitchell was used to film the majority of the aerial scenes with several fixed and trainable cameras also mounted on the available B-17s and fighter aircraft for action shots. A Grumman TBM Avenger (with its tail section painted the same olive drab tones used on the B-17s) was used as back-up for a short time when the B-25 became unserviceable during filming.

The film pilots were warbird display pilots coming from the UK, USA, France, Germany, New Zealand and Norway, the roster changing several times as pilots had to return to their full-time jobs during filming. The flying sequences were devised and planned under the coordination of Old Flying Machine Company (OFMC) pilots Ray Hanna and his son Mark, who also acted as chief pilots for the fighter aircraft used and flew the camera-equipped fighter and TBM Avenger aircraft during filming.

Due to a shortage of actual B-17 airframes, wooden silhouette mock-ups were made and placed at distant parts of the airfield.

Filming accident

A French B-17G (F-BEEA), used as a filming platform, hit a tree and a pile of gravel after losing engine power and swinging during takeoff from Binbrook and was destroyed by the subsequent fire. All 10 of the crew escaped with only minor injuries, the most serious of which being a broken leg. While lined up on runway 21 awaiting takeoff, a puff of smoke was observed by a ground engineer from the vicinity of engine three which he conjectured could have been due to an over-boost. The aircraft commenced its ground roll and after about  swung slightly to the left, which the commander (the handling pilot) corrected with the rudder and by reducing power to number 3 and 4 engines. Once corrected full power on all engines was resumed but the aircraft swung right. The commander applied corrective rudder and reduced power to number 1 and 2 engines, but this was not immediately effective and the aircraft left the runway before straightening, parallel to the runway. Knowing that the aircraft was capable of being operated from grass landing strips, the pilot opted to continue the takeoff; however, after  and at an airspeed of  the aircraft swung right and its course was obstructed by a tree which was hit by the left wing and a pile of gravel which was hit by the number 4 propeller. The aircraft yawed to the right and came to rest in a cornfield; the fuselage broke into two sections aft of the bomb bay and caught fire.

Historical accuracy
With the exception of the aircraft names, this film is fiction based only very loosely on fact. The characters are composites, the names are not those of the real crew of the Memphis Belle and the incidents shown are supposed to be representative of B-17 missions in general. The characters and situations of the film bear little resemblance to the crew of the actual Memphis Belle, the nature of her final mission, the accuracy of strategic bombing, or Allied policy on the bombing of civilians. No optimistic official celebration on the evening before the Belle's 25th mission occurred, and there was no special welcome for the crew when the mission was over.

For the fighters, seven P-51 Mustangs were used. Five of the P-51s were painted in the markings of the first USAAF Merlin-engined Mustang squadron to operate in Britain (a few months later in 1943 than the actual mission). As there were no surviving flyable Messerschmitt Bf 109s, Luftwaffe fighter aircraft were represented by Ha-1112s, a Spanish version of the Bf 109 (which were also used to represent Bf 109s in the 1969 film Battle of Britain) in mid-war generic paint schemes.

Soundtrack

"The Chestnut Tree", performed by Glenn Miller And His Orchestra and written by Tommie Connor, Jimmy Kennedy and Hamilton Kennedy is featured in the film playing over the Memphis Belle's radio, but isn't on the soundtrack album. The upbeat version of "Danny Boy" performed by Connick at the party is not found on the soundtrack album; a slower version performed by Mark Williamson appears instead. The film score, by George Fenton, was nominated for a BAFTA award for Best Original Film Score in 1991.

The Original Motion Picture Soundtrack album was recorded at Abbey Road Studios, CTS Studios, and Angel Recording Studios in London, England. Included is Glenn Miller and His Orchestra performing "I Know Why (And So Do You)".

Track listing
 "Londonderry Air" / "Front Titles: Memphis Belle" (traditional / George Fenton) - 3:50
 "Green Eyes" (Nilo Menendez, Eddie Rivera, Eddie Woods) - 3:25
 "Flying Home" (Benny Goodman, Lionel Hampton, Sydney Robin) - 2:57
 "The Steel Lady" (Fenton) - 1:44
 "Prepare For Take Off" ("Amazing Grace") (traditional) - 2:39
 "The Final Mission" (Fenton) - 3:51
 "With Deep Regret..." (Fenton) - 2:02
 "I Know Why (And So Do You)" (Mack Gordon, Harry Warren) - 2:55 - performed by Glenn Miller and His Orchestra
 "The Bomb Run" (Fenton) - 1:30
 "Limping Home" (Fenton) - 2:25
 "Crippled Belle: The Landing" (Fenton) - 3:26
 "Resolution" (Fenton) - 1:06
 "Memphis Belle" (End Title Suite) (Fenton) - 7:37
 "Danny Boy" (Theme from Memphis Belle) (Frederic E. Weatherly) - 3:20 - performed by Mark Williamson

Reception
Memphis Belle received mixed reviews, with Roger Ebert stating the film was "entertaining" yet filled with familiar wartime cliches. "This human element in the experience of the Memphis Belle crew somehow compensates for a lack of human dimension in the characters. We can't really tell the crew members apart and don't much care to, but we can identify with them." UK film reviewer Andy Webb had similar reservations. "Despite its good intentions to highlight the risks and heroics of the brave men who flew dangerous bombing missions deep into enemy soil during World War II, the one thing which you can't miss about Memphis Belle is that it is a cliche commercial production."

On Rotten Tomatoes the film has an approval rating of 68% based on reviews from 25 critics.
Audiences surveyed by CinemaScore gave the film a grade A on scale of A to F.

Box office
The film opened in the UK on 266 screens and grossed £1,174,250 in its opening week, ranking number one at the box office. It was number one in its second week too. It went on to gross £4,924,000 in the UK.

See also
 Strategic bombing during World War II

References

Notes

Citations

Bibliography

 Carlson, Mark. Flying on Film: A Century of Aviation in the Movies, 1912–2012. Duncan, Oklahoma: BearManor Media, 2012. .
 Farmer, James H. Celluloid Wings: The Impact of Movies on Aviation. Blue Ridge Summit, Pennsylvania: Tab Books Inc., 1984. .
 Farmer, James H. "The Making of Memphis Belle." Air Classics, Volume 26, Number 11, November 1990.
 Morgan, Robert, and Ron Powers. The Man Who Flew the Memphis Belle. New York: Penguin Putnam, 2001. .
 Orriss, Bruce. When Hollywood Ruled the Skies: The Aviation Film Classics of World War II. Hawthorne, California: Aero Associates Inc., 1984. .

External links
 
 
 
 
 
 

1990 films
1990s war drama films
Boeing B-17 Flying Fortress
British war drama films
Films about the United States Army
Films about the United States Army Air Forces
Films directed by Michael Caton-Jones
Films produced by David Puttnam
Films scored by George Fenton
Films set in 1943
Films set in Memphis, Tennessee
Films set on airplanes
Films shot at Pinewood Studios
Films shot in Cambridgeshire
Films shot in Lincolnshire
War epic films
Warner Bros. films
World War II aviation films
1990s English-language films
1990s American films
1990s British films